This is a list of notable street artists.

Africa

Egypt

 Alaa Awad - street art, painter
 Aya Tarek –  graffiti
 Chico –  stencil graffiti, street art
 El Teneen –  graffiti
 Ganzeer –  stencil graffiti
 Keizer –  stencil graffiti, street poster art

Nigeria

Osa Seven –  graffiti, street art, graphic design

South Africa

 Faith47 –  graffiti, street art, fine art
 Ben Jay Crossman - graffiti-style street artist, concept artist, illustrator, photographer, film producer, director

Americas

Argentina

Milagros Correch - muralist
 Ever (Buenos Aires) –  street art

Brazil

 Alexandre Ōrion –  graffiti, stencil graffiti, photography
 Os Gemeos –  graffiti
 Ananda Nahu –  graffiti
 Eduardo Kobra –  graffiti, muralist

Canada

 Esm-Artificial –  wheatpasting, screen printing
 Posterchild –  stencil graffiti, street poster art

Mexico

 Pablo Delgado –  paste-ups

Venezuela 

 Enrique Enn –  stencil graffiti, street poster art

United States

(alphabetical by last name, unless the full name is a "stage name")
A–L

M–Z

Asia

Afghanistan 
 Shamsia Hassani – street art, digital art

Hong Kong

 Tsang Tsou Choi, also known as "King of Kowloon" –  graffiti

India

 Daku, pseudonymous  –  graffiti, social commentary
 Yantr, pseudonymous  –  machines, social commentary

Iran

 A1one, also known as "Tanha" –  graffiti, street Art
 Black Hand –  pseudonymous stencil artist
 Reza Rioter –  graffiti

Israel

Solomon Souza  –  spray-paint art
Know Hope - Social Practice artist

Korea

Royal Dog - graffiti writing, spray murals

Pakistan

Sanki King (Karachi) –  graffiti, street art, sneaker art

Thailand
 Headache Stencil

Yemen
 Murad Subay,  known for his street art campaigns, that engage the community in doing art and murals to express themselves via art – street art and graffiti

Europe

Belgium

 ROA –  graffiti (animals and birds)

Denmark

 TEJN – Lock On street sculptures, paste up, stencil, installation, conceptual art

Finland

 Sampsa –  graffiti, stencil art and painting

France

Georgia

 Gagosh –  street artist; stencil, graffiti, mosaics, installation

Germany

Greece

 Argiris Ser –  street art, graffiti, lowbrow
 Bleeps.gr –  street painting, wheatpasting, stencil graffiti
 INO –  painting, murals, graffiti, street art
 Woozy (born 1979 as Vaggelis Hoursoglou) –  street art, graffiti

Ireland

 Will St Leger –  stencil, painting

Italy

 108 –  graffiti
 Blu –  graffiti, stop motion
Cibo – murals over neo-fascist graffiti
 Geco – graffiti
 Sten Lex –  stencil

The Netherlands

 Ces53
 Harmen de Hoop –  art interventions
  - Large scale realistic murals
 Leon Keer –  3D street artist, anamorphic, street art
 Max Zorn

Norway

 Dolk –  graffiti, stencil graffiti
 DOT DOT DOT –  visual art, public art, conceptual art, graffiti
 Pøbel –  graffiti, stencil graffiti
 Martin Whatson –  graffiti

Poland

 Crocheted Olek  –  yarn bombing

Portugal

 Add Fuel (born Diogo Machado) –  graffiti 
 Vhils –  bas relief

Russia

 Pavel 183 –  graffiti

Spain

 Chanoir (Barcelona) –  graffiti
 El Xupet Negre (Barcelona) –  graffiti
 La Mano/Nami (Spanish for The Hand) –  graffiti artist based in Barcelona
 Muelle (Madrid)

Sweden

 Akay –  graffiti
 Czon –  sculptures, statues, installations, pasties, graffiti
 Max Magnus Norman –  sculptures, installations
 NUG –  graffiti, video art

Switzerland

 Dare (graffiti artist) (1968-2010) real name Sigi (Siegfried) von Koeding, was a Swiss graffiti artist and curator
 Harald Naegeli (born December 4, 1939) –  known as the "Sprayer of Zurich" after the graffiti he sprayed in the late 1970s
 NEVERCREW (Christian Rebecchi, born December 20, 1980; Pablo Togni, born September 29, 1979) –  mural paintings, installations

England

Oceania

Australia

See also

 Lists of artists by nationality

References 

Lists of artists by medium